Mamadou Keïta (born 20 October 1947 in Bamako, death 9 April 2008) was a Malian professional football player and manager.

Career
After primary studies in Bagadadji and secondary studies in the Technical School and Secondary Normal School in Bamako, Mamadou Keïta studied at the College of Sports in Cologne (Germany) where he obtained a Sport Teacher Certificate, Diploma for Football 1974/1975.

Mamadou Keïta played for the Stade Malien from Bamako. He was a player of the Mali national football team and played in particular during the 1972 Africa Cup of Nations in Yaoundé, where he named best goalkeeper.

Mamadou Keïta has coached several Ivorian clubs (Gonfreville Alliance Club (GAC) in Bouaké, ASC Bouaké, Africa Sports d'Abidjan, AS Denguélé in Odienné), Malian clubs (Stade Malien, AS Biton in Segou) and Gabonese club (Jeunesse Athletic Club in Port-Gentil, Club Sport Batavéa (CBS) in Libreville).

In 1983-1984, he led the junior national team of Mali (the "eagles"). In 1993, he became coach of the Mali national football team for the 1994 African Cup of Nations.

Since August 2004 until February 2005 he again coached the Mali national football team.

Mamadou Keïta died on 9 April 2008.

References

External links

Profile at Soccerpunter.com

1947 births
2008 deaths
Malian footballers
Mali international footballers
Association football goalkeepers
Stade Malien players
1972 African Cup of Nations players
Malian football managers
Expatriate football managers in Gabon
Malian expatriate sportspeople in Gabon
Expatriate football managers in Ivory Coast
Malian expatriate sportspeople in Ivory Coast
Malian expatriate football managers
Mali national football team managers
Sportspeople from Bamako
21st-century Malian people